Benjamin Sherman Crothers (May 23, 1910 – November 22, 1986), known professionally as Scatman Crothers, was an American actor and musician. He is known for playing Louie the Garbage Man on the TV show Chico and the Man, and Dick Hallorann in Stanley Kubrick's The Shining (1980). He was also a prolific voice-over actor who provided the voices of Meadowlark Lemon in the Harlem Globetrotters animated TV series, Jazz the Autobot in The Transformers and The Transformers: The Movie (1986), the title character in Hong Kong Phooey, and Scat Cat in the animated film The Aristocats (1970).

Music career
Crothers began his musical career as a teenager. He sang and was self-educated on guitar and drums. He was in a band that played in speakeasies in Terre Haute. During the 1930s, Crothers formed a band, spending eight years living in Akron, Ohio, and performing five days a week on a radio show in Dayton, Ohio. The station manager thought he needed a catchier name, so Crothers suggested "Scatman" for his scat singing. He married Helen, a native of Steubenville, Ohio, in 1937. In the 1940s, the couple moved to California.

He performed in Los Angeles, Las Vegas, and at the Apollo Theater in Harlem, New York City. Capitol released several of his singles: "I'd Rather Be a Hummingbird", "Blue-eyed Sally", and "Television Blues". High Fidelity Records released his album Rock and Roll with Scatman Crothers. He went on USO tours with Bob Hope. Crothers also performed with bandleader Slim Gaillard. According to the jacket notes of the Let Freedom Sing CD set, Crothers was part of the music group The Ramparts, who sang "The Death of Emmett Till" (1955), a song by A. C. Bilbrew.

Film and television career

Crothers made his film debut in the movie Meet Me at the Fair (1953). He had roles in the film musicals Hello Dolly! (1969) and The Great White Hope (1970) before providing the voice of Scat Cat in the animated film  The Aristocats (1970). Crothers appeared in four films with Jack Nicholson: The King of Marvin Gardens (1972), The Fortune (1975), One Flew Over the Cuckoo's Nest (1975), and The Shining (1980). He had the part of a fable-telling convict in the animated film Coonskin (1975), a train porter in Silver Streak (1976), a liveryman in The Shootist (1976), Mingo in Roots (1977), a ringmaster in Bronco Billy (1980), a baseball coach in Zapped! (1982), and angels in Two of a Kind (1983) and Twilight Zone: The Movie (1983).

Crothers became the first Black person to appear regularly in a Los Angeles television show when he joined Dixie Showboat. After The Aristocats in the 1970s, Crothers found voice acting jobs as Meadowlark Lemon in the Harlem Globetrotters cartoon series and as the title character in Hong Kong Phooey. For four years, he played the role of Louie the garbage man on Chico and the Man. During his appearance on Sanford and Son Crothers joined Redd Foxx for two musical numbers. One was a version of the standard "All of Me", in which he accompanied Foxx on tenor guitar. In 1966, Hanna-Barbera aired an animated special called The New Alice in Wonderland (or What's a Nice Kid like You Doing in a Place like This?), an updated version of the Lewis Carroll story featuring Sammy Davis Jr. as the Cheshire Cat. The special was followed by an audio adaptation for HB Records, but since Davis was signed to Reprise, Crothers provided the cat's voice for the album.

Crothers had guest roles on Alfred Hitchcock Presents in 1958, Dragnet in 1967, Bewitched and McMillan & Wife in 1971, Adam-12 in 1972 (as "George Strothers"), Kojak and Ironside in 1973, Kolchak: The Night Stalker and Sanford and Son in 1974, Starsky & Hutch in 1977, Charlie's Angels and The Love Boat in 1978, Magnum, P.I. in 1980, Benson in 1982, and Taxi in 1983. Also in 1980, he was on two episodes of Laverne & Shirley as a porter. In the 1980s, he provided the voice of the Autobot Jazz on the television series The Transformers. He starred in three short-lived 1980s television series: One of the Boys (1982), Casablanca (1983), and Morningstar/Eveningstar (1986).

Death
On November 22, 1986, Crothers died at the age of 76 at his home in Van Nuys, California, after struggling with lung cancer for nearly four years. He is buried at Forest Lawn Memorial Park Cemetery in Los Angeles.

Awards and honors
 Best Supporting Actor, Academy of Science Fiction, Fantasy, and Horror, for The Shining (1980)
 Star on Hollywood Walk of Fame, 1981
 NAACP Image Award
 Black Filmmakers Hall of Fame, 1987 (posthumous)

Filmography

 King Cole Trio & Benny Carter Orchestra (1950) (short subject) as himself
 Yes Sir, Mr. Bones (1951) as Scathman
 The Return of Gilbert and Sullivan (1952)
 Meet Me at the Fair (1953) as Enoch Jones
 Surprising Suzie (1953) (short subject)
 East of Sumatra (1953) as Baltimore
 Walking My Baby Back Home (1953) as Smiley Gordon
 Johnny Dark (1954)
 Team Berlin (1955) (short subject)
 Between Heaven and Hell (1956) as George (uncredited)
 The Gift of Love (1958) as Sam the Gardner (uncredited)
 Tarzan and the Trappers (1958) as Tyana
 Alias Jesse James (1959) as a railroad porter (uncredited)
 Porgy and Bess (1959) as Crabman
 The Sins of Rachel Cade (1961) as Musinga
 Lady in a Cage (1964) as the junkyard proprietor's assistant (uncredited)
 The Patsy (1964) as the Shoeshine Boy
 The Family Jewels (1965) as an airport employee (uncredited)
 Three on a Couch (1966) as a jazz band member (uncredited)
 Alvarez Kelly (1966) as Bellhop (uncredited)
 Hook, Line & Sinker (1969) as a corpse (uncredited)
 Hello, Dolly! (1969) as Mr. Jones, a porter (uncredited)
 Bloody Mama (1970) as Moses the caretaker
 The Great White Hope (1970) as a carnival barker (uncredited)
 The Aristocats (1970) as Scat Cat (voice)
 Chandler (1971) as Smoke
 Lady Sings the Blues (1972) as Big Ben
 The King of Marvin Gardens (1972) as Lewis
 Detroit 9000 (1973) as Reverend Markham
 Slaughter's Big Rip-Off (1973) as Cleveland
 Black Belt Jones (1974) as Pop Byrd
 Truck Turner (1974) as Duke
 Win, Place or Steal (1975) as the Attendant
 Linda Lovelace for President (1975) as Super Black
 The Fortune (1975) as the Fisherman
 Coonskin (1975) as Pappy / Old Man Bone (voice)
 One Flew Over the Cuckoo's Nest (1975) as Mr. Turkle
 Friday Foster (1975) as Noble Franklin
 Stay Hungry (1976) as William
 The Shootist (1976) as Moses Brown
 Chesty Anderson, USN (1976) as Ben Benson
 Silver Streak (1976) as Ralson, a railroad porter
 Mean Dog Blues (1978) as Mudcat
 The Cheap Detective (1978) as Tinker
 Scavenger Hunt (1979) as Sam
 Banjo the Woodpile Cat (1979) as Crazy Legs (voice)
 The Shining (1980) as Dick Hallorann
 Bronco Billy (1980) as Doc Lynch
 The Harlem Globetrotters on Gilligan's Island (1981) (made for TV) as Dewey Stevens
 Zapped! (1982) as Coach Dexter Jones
 Deadly Eyes (1982) as George Foskins
 Twilight Zone: The Movie (1983) as Mr. Bloom (segment "Kick the Can")
 Two of a Kind (1983) as Earl
 The Journey of Natty Gann (1985) as Sherman
 Morningstar/Eveningstar (1986) (TV Series) as Excell Dennis
 The Transformers: The Movie (1986) as Jazz (voice)
 Rock Odyssey (1987) as Jukebox (voice), posthumous release

Television

 The Adventures of Jim Bowie – episode – The Quarantine – Cicero (1957)
 Alfred Hitchcock Presents – episode – Don't Interrupt – Timothy (1958)
 Beany and Cecil - multiple episodes and bumpers - Go Man Van Gogh (singing voice only at first, then regular voice, 1959–1960)
 Bonanza – episode – The Smiler – Jud (1961)
 The Famous Adventures of Mr. Magoo (1964)
 Dragnet – episode – The Missing Realtor – Dave Richmond (1967)
 Harlem Globetrotters – George 'Meadowlark' Lemon (1970–71)
 The Wonderful World of Disney – Disney on Parade – King Louie (voice, uncredited) (1971)
 Bewitched – episode – Three Men and a Witch on a Horse – Handler (1971)
 The Lorax – TV special – Singer (voice, uncredited) (1972)
 Nichols – episode – Eddie Joe – Jack (1972)
 The New Scooby-Doo Movies – episodes – The Ghostly Creep from the Deep/The Loch Ness Mess/Mystery of Haunted Island (1972–73)
 Kojak – episode – The Corrupter – Gaylord Fuller (1973)
 Hong Kong Phooey – 16 episodes – Hong Kong Phooey / Penrod 'Penry' Pooch (1974)
 Mannix – episode – The Green Man – Mudcat (1974)
 The Odd Couple (1970 TV series) – episode – The Subway Show (1974)
 McMillan & Wife – episode – Downshift to Danger – Floyd (1974)
 Chico and the Man – Louie the Garbage Man (1974–78)
 Sanford and Son – episode – The Stand-In – Bowlegs (1975)
 Roots – TV miniseries – Mingo (1977)
 Dean Martin Celebrity Roast: Angie Dickinson – TV Special – Himself (1977)
 Laff-A-Lympics – Hong Kong Phooey (1977)
 CB Bears – Segment title narrator (1977)
 The Skatebirds – Scat Cat (1977)
 Starsky and Hutch – episode – Long Walk Down a Short Dirt Road – Fireball (1977)
 Captain Caveman and the Teen Angels – Additional Voices (1977–80)
 NBC Salutes the 25th Anniversary of the Wonderful World of Disney – TV Movie documentary – Himself (1978)
 Charlie's Angels – episode – Angels in Vegas – Jip Baker (1978)
 The Love Boat – cruise ship passenger (1978)
 Vega$ – episodes – High Roller (Vega$ pilot) , & The Usurper – as Rosey (1978–79)
 The Super Globetrotters – Nate Branch / Liquid Man (1979)
 The Incredible Hulk – episode – My Favorite Magician – Edgar McGee (1979)
 Laverne & Shirley – episode – Murder on the Moosejaw Express Part 1 & Part 2 – Porter (1980)
 Magnum, P.I. – episode – Lest We Forget – Tickler (1981)
 Trollkins – Additional Voices (1981)
 The Harlem Globetrotters on Gilligan's Island – TV Movie – Dewey Stevens (1981)
 Jokebook – Main Title Singer (1982)
 Benson – episode – In the Red – Rev. Tompkins (1982)
 Casablanca – Sam (1983)
 Taxi – episode – A Grand Gesture – Walt (1983)
 This Is Your Life – episode – Scatman Crothers – Himself (1984)
 The Transformers – voice of Autobot Jazz (1984–86)
 Paw Paws – Eugene the Genie (1985–86)
 The Paper Chase – Mr. Sims (1985)
 The Wonderful World of Jonathan Winters  – Himself (1986)

References

External links

 
 

1910 births
1986 deaths
Actors from Terre Haute, Indiana
20th-century American male actors
20th-century American singers
African-American male actors
20th-century African-American male singers
American male film actors
American male voice actors
Male actors from Indiana
Singers from Indiana
Scat singers
Challenge Records artists
Deaths from lung cancer in California
Deaths from pneumonia in California
Burials at Forest Lawn Memorial Park (Hollywood Hills)
20th-century American male singers
American male jazz musicians
Recorded In Hollywood artists
Decca Records artists
Capitol Records artists
Hanna-Barbera people